Wuhan Business District Station, is a station of Line 3 and Line 7 of Wuhan Metro. It entered revenue service on December 28, 2015. It is located in Jianghan District. This station is an interchange station of Line 3, Line 7 and the under planning Line 10. It is near the Wuhan CBD.

Station layout

Gallery

References

Wuhan Metro stations
Line 3, Wuhan Metro
Line 7, Wuhan Metro
Railway stations in China opened in 2015
Jianghan District